is a Paralympic swimmer from Japan competing mainly in category S7 events.

Daisuke has competed at two Paralympics, firstly in 2004 in Athens and then in 2008 in Beijing.  In Athens he was part of the Japanese 4x50m Medley team that won a silver medal behind a new Paralympic record set by Brazil.  He also competed in the 50m butterfly finishing seventh, 100m backstroke finishing seventh and was disqualified from the heat of 200m individual medley.  At the 2008 games he competed in the same individual events finishing fourth in the 50m butterfly, fifth in the 100m backstroke and seventh in the 200m individual medley.

References

External links
 

Paralympic swimmers of Japan
Swimmers at the 2004 Summer Paralympics
Swimmers at the 2008 Summer Paralympics
Paralympic silver medalists for Japan
Japanese male backstroke swimmers
Japanese male butterfly swimmers
Japanese male medley swimmers
Living people
Swimmers at the 2012 Summer Paralympics
Medalists at the 2004 Summer Paralympics
S7-classified Paralympic swimmers
Year of birth missing (living people)
Paralympic medalists in swimming
21st-century Japanese people
Medalists at the 2018 Asian Para Games